Magnetic switchbacks are sudden reversals in the magnetic field of the solar wind. They can also be described as traveling disturbances in the solar wind that caused the magnetic field to bend back on itself. They were first observed by the NASA-ESA  mission Ulysses, the first spacecraft to fly over the Sun's poles. Parker Solar Probe first observed switchbacks in 2018.

Theories and observations 

One theory, based on the Ulysses data, suggests that switchbacks are the result of a clash between open and closed magnetic fields. When an open magnetic field line brushes against a closed magnetic loop, they can reconfigure in a process called interchange reconnection – an explosive rearrangement of the magnetic fields that leads to a switchback shape. The open line snaps onto the closed loop, cutting free a hot burst of plasma from the loop, while "gluing" the two fields into a new configuration. That sudden snap throws an S-shaped kink into the open magnetic field line before the loop reseals. The Parker Solar Probe (PSP) observed its first switchback on November 6, 2018. The observed switchback was close to the developed model.

A second theory agrees on the import of interchange reconnection, but differs on the nature of switchbacks themselves. Instead of viewing switchbacks as a kink in a magnetic field line, the second theory suggests it is the signature of a kind of magnetic structure, called a flux rope.

Another theory suggests that switchbacks form naturally as the solar wind expands into space.

The switchbacks, essentially S-shaped kinks in the magnetic field lines streaming from the Sun, seem to arise from a reconfiguration of open and looped magnetic field lines already in the Sun's atmosphere. When an open magnetic field line encounters a closed magnetic loop they can undergo a process called interchange reconnection. This allows the open magnetic field line to snap into the loop, and allows one side of the formerly closed magnetic loop to connect to solar magnetic field extending outwards into the solar system. This process would create an outward-flowing S-shaped kink in the newly formed open magnetic field line — a shape that tracks with the switchbacks measured by Parker Solar Probe.

Given the phase of the solar cycle, if PSP was in the southern magnetic hemisphere, the solar wind magnetic field should always have had a magnetic polarity oriented inward toward the Sun. Instead, PSP observed thousands of intervals, ranging in duration from seconds to tens of minutes where the speed of the solar wind flow suddenly jumps and the magnetic field orientation rotates by nearly 180° in the most extreme cases, before returning just as quickly to the original solar wind conditions. These events have been termed switchbacks, when referring to the change in magnetic field direction, or velocity spikes, when referring to the sharp increase in solar wind speed.

Latest findings

The ESA/NASA Solar Orbiter spacecraft has found compelling clues as to the origin of magnetic switchbacks during its closest pass by the sun on 25 March 2022. Using the data of the Solar Orbiter Daniele Telloni and Gary Zank and their team came to the conclusion that the theory based on Ulysses data is correct, they "proved that switchbacks occur when there is an interaction between a region of open field lines and a region of closed field lines".

Further reading

References 

Sun
Solar phenomena